Caladenia ambusta, commonly known as the Boranup spider orchid, is a plant in the orchid family Orchidaceae and is endemic to the south-west of Western Australia. It is only known from a relatively small area south-west of Margaret River growing in deep sand in shrubland and woodland and only flowering profusely after fire.

Description
The leaf is pale green and blotched with reddish-purple on its lower end. The petals and lateral sepals are linear to lance-shaped near their bases and spread more or less horizontally, but the outer 2/3 is abruptly narrower, yellow-brown in colour and hangs threadlike. There are white to deep red calli along the edges of the labellum and four to six rows of calli shaped like hockey sticks in its central part. Flowering occurs from late October to mid-November and is stimulated by bushfire in the previous summer.

Taxonomy and naming
Caladenia ambusta was first formally described by Andrew Brown and Garry Brockman in 2015 from a specimen collected near Boranup and the description was published in Nuytsia. The specific epithet (ambusta) is a Latin word meaning "a burn", referring to the species' prolific flowering after fire.

Distribution and habitat
Boranup spider orchid occurs in a relatively small area south west of the township of Margaret River in the Warren biogeographic region where it grows in deep sand in shrubland and woodland.

Conservation
Caladenia ambusta is classified as "Priority Two" by the Western Australian Government Department of Parks and Wildlife, meaning that it is poorly known and known from only one or a few locations.

References

ambusta
Endemic orchids of Australia
Orchids of Western Australia
Plants described in 2015
Taxa named by Andrew Phillip Brown